The 1944 Republican National Convention was held in Chicago, Illinois, from June 26 to 28, 1944. It nominated Governor Thomas E. Dewey of New York for president and Governor John Bricker of Ohio for vice president.

Background 
When the convention opened, Governor Dewey was the front-runner for the nomination. 1940 presidential nominee, Wendell Willkie again vied for the nomination, but when he lost the Wisconsin primary, the lack of support from the Republican Party became evident. (Before the election, Willkie would die of a heart attack.) General Douglas MacArthur withdrew his name from consideration in May.

Conservative opposition to Dewey coalesced briefly around Governor John W. Bricker of Ohio, but Dewey was the overwhelming favorite as the party's convention opened in Chicago in June.

Presidential nomination

Presidential candidates 

Before balloting began, Bricker withdrew in favor of Dewey, removing the last vestige of opposition. Dewey was nominated on the first ballot with 1,056 votes to 1 for MacArthur.

Dewey became the second Republican candidate to accept his party's nomination in-person at the convention. All subsequent Republican nominees have accepted their nominations in person with the exception of Donald Trump who in 2020 delivered his re-nomination acceptance speech from The White House because of the COVID-19 pandemic.

Presidential Balloting / 3rd Day of Convention (June 28, 1944)

Vice Presidential nomination

Vice Presidential candidates 

Bricker was nominated unanimously for the vice presidency. A deal was reached between the Dewey and Bricker factions the previous night in which Bricker would withdraw in favor of Dewey in exchange for the number two spot on the ticket.

Vice Presidential Balloting / 3rd Day of Convention (June 28, 1944)

Platform 
The 1944 Republican platform included a call for a Constitutional amendment establishing equal rights for women. This line was included in all subsequent platforms until 1980, when the debate over the Equal Rights Amendment was occurring.

Cultural Impact 
During the convention, Chicago's Billy Goat Tavern gained notoriety for posting a notice saying "No Republicans Allowed". This caused Republican conventioneers to pack the place, demanding to be served, and led to increased publicity for the tavern.

See also 
 1944 Republican Party vice presidential candidate selection
 History of the United States Republican Party
 List of Republican National Conventions
 U.S. presidential nomination convention
 Republican Party presidential primaries, 1944
 1944 United States presidential election
 1944 Democratic National Convention

References

External links 
 Republican Party platform of 1944 at The American Presidency Project
 Dewey acceptance speech at The American Presidency Project

Republican National Conventions
1944 United States presidential election
Political conventions in Chicago
1944 in Illinois
June 1944 events
1944 conferences